Deerfield Township is a township in Cumberland County, in the U.S. state of New Jersey. It is part of the Vineland--Bridgeton metropolitan statistical area, which encompasses those cities and all of Cumberland County for statistical purposes and which constitutes a part of the Delaware Valley. As of the 2020 United States census, the township's population was 3,136, an increase of 17 (+0.5%) from the 2010 census count of 3,119, which in turn reflected an increase of 192 (+6.6%) from the 2,927 counted in the 2000 census.

Deerfield Township was formed as a precinct on January 19, 1748, and was incorporated by an act of the New Jersey Legislature on February 21, 1798, as one of New Jersey's initial group of 104 townships. Portions of the township were taken to form Bridgeton Township (March 3, 1845) and Upper Deerfield Township (February 23, 1922). The township was named for Deerfield, Massachusetts.

Geography
According to the United States Census Bureau, the township had a total area of 16.88 square miles (43.72 km2), including 16.84 square miles (43.62 km2) of land and 0.04 square miles (0.10 km2) of water (0.22%).

Rosenhayn (2010 population of 1,098) is an unincorporated community and census-designated place (CDP) located within Deerfield Township.

Other unincorporated communities, localities and place names located partially or completely within the township include Carmel and Garton.

Deerfield Township borders Fairfield Township, Millville, Upper Deerfield Township and Vineland in Cumberland County; and Pittsgrove Township in Salem County.

Demographics

2010 census

The Census Bureau's 2006–2010 American Community Survey showed that (in 2010 inflation-adjusted dollars) median household income was $68,571 (with a margin of error of +/− $6,904) and the median family income was $73,566 (+/− $9,367). Males had a median income of $46,309 (+/− $5,147) versus $31,574 (+/− $6,302) for females. The per capita income for the borough was $26,799 (+/− $3,131). About 3.1% of families and 7.3% of the population were below the poverty line, including 11.6% of those under age 18 and 3.9% of those age 65 or over.

2000 census
As of the 2000 United States census there were 2,927 people, 1,013 households, and 785 families residing in the township. The racial makeup of the township was 78.20% White, 13.05% African American, 1.54% Native American, 1.02% Asian, 3.04% from other races, and 3.14% from two or more races. Hispanic or Latino of any race were 5.94% of the population.

There were 1,013 households, out of which 34.8% had children under the age of 18 living with them, 58.0% were married couples living together, 14.0% had a female householder with no husband present, and 22.5% were non-families. 17.6% of all households were made up of individuals, and 8.2% had someone living alone who was 65 years of age or older.  The average household size was 2.86 and the average family size was 3.22.

In the township the population was spread out, with 26.4% under the age of 18, 7.6% from 18 to 24, 27.2% from 25 to 44, 24.8% from 45 to 64, and 14.1% who were 65 years of age or older.  The median age was 39 years. For every 100 females, there were 94.9 males.  For every 100 females age 18 and over, there were 92.3 males.

The median income for a household in the township was $45,365, and the median income for a family was $47,225. Males had a median income of $34,196 versus $25,147 for females. The per capita income for the township was $18,468.  About 6.3% of families and 9.2% of the population were below the poverty line, including 8.3% of those under age 18 and 14.2% of those age 65 or over.

Government

Local government 
Deerfield Township is governed under the Township form of New Jersey municipal government, one of 141 municipalities (of the 564) statewide that use this form, the second-most commonly used form of government in the state. The Township Committee is comprised of five members, who are elected directly by the voters at-large in partisan elections to serve three-year terms of office on a staggered basis, with either one or two seats coming up for election each year as part of the November general election in a three-year cycle. At an annual reorganization meeting held in January, the Township Committee selects one of its members to serve as Mayor and another to serve as Deputy Mayor.

, members of the Deerfield Township Committee are Mayor Abigail Perlstein O'Brien (R, term on committee ends December 31, 2024; term as mayor ends December 31, 2022), Deputy Mayor Brian L. Casper (R, term on committee and as deputy mayor ends 2022), Anthony A. Brago (R, 2023), Dominick Patitucci (R, 2024) and Michael A. Terrigno (R, 2023).

After being tied on election day at the November 2014 general election with 362 votes, Democratic incumbent Frank Spatola Jr. was re-elected with 366 votes, edging Republican challenger Jason P. Scythes by three votes once provisional ballots were counted. At the township's January 2015 reorganization meeting, Sparacio was sworn in using a conference call as he was stationed outside the country as part of his service with the Air National Guard.

Federal, state and county representation 
Deerfield Township is located in the 2nd Congressional District and is part of New Jersey's 3rd state legislative district.

Politics
As of March 2011, there were a total of 2,087 registered voters in Deerfield Township, of which 552 (26.4%) were registered as Democrats, 522 (25.0%) were registered as Republicans and 1,013 (48.5%) were registered as Unaffiliated. There were no voters registered to other parties.

In the 2012 presidential election, Democrat Barack Obama received 53.4% of the vote (698 cast), ahead of Republican Mitt Romney with 45.7% (597 votes), and other candidates with 0.9% (12 votes), among the 1,325 ballots cast by the township's 2,125 registered voters (18 ballots were spoiled), for a turnout of 62.4%. In the 2008 presidential election, Democrat Barack Obama received 52.0% of the vote (744 cast), ahead of Republican John McCain, who received 46.1% (659 votes), with 1,431 ballots cast among the township's 2,066 registered voters, for a turnout of 69.3%. In the 2004 presidential election, Democrat John Kerry received 51.0% of the vote (665 ballots cast), outpolling Republican George W. Bush, who received around 47.5% (619 votes), with 1,303 ballots cast among the township's 1,847 registered voters, for a turnout percentage of 70.5.

In the 2013 gubernatorial election, Republican Chris Christie received 65.4% of the vote (532 cast), ahead of Democrat Barbara Buono with 33.7% (274 votes), and other candidates with 1.0% (8 votes), among the 831 ballots cast by the township's 2,015 registered voters (17 ballots were spoiled), for a turnout of 41.2%. In the 2009 gubernatorial election, Republican Chris Christie received 45.8% of the vote (445 ballots cast), ahead of both Democrat Jon Corzine with 42.8% (416 votes) and Independent Chris Daggett with 6.9% (67 votes), with 971 ballots cast among the township's 2,070 registered voters, yielding a 46.9% turnout.

Education 
The Deerfield Township School District serves public school students in pre-kindergarten through eighth grade at Deerfield Township School. As of the 2021–22 school year, the district, comprised of one school, had an enrollment of 278 students and 29.2 classroom teachers (on an FTE basis), for a student–teacher ratio of 9.5:1.

Public school students in ninth through twelfth grades attend Cumberland Regional High School, which also serves students from Fairfield Township, Greenwich Township, Hopewell Township, Shiloh Borough, Stow Creek Township and Upper Deerfield Township. As of the 2021–22 school year, the high school had an enrollment of 1,081 students and 80.5 classroom teachers (on an FTE basis), for a student–teacher ratio of 13.4:1. The high school district has a nine-member board of education, with board seats allocated to the constituent municipalities based on population, with each municipality assigned a minimum of one seat; Deerfield Township has one seat on the board.

Cumberland County Technology Education Center is a public countywide school in Millville. Previously it was a part-time school in Deerfield Township. It moved to its current location and became full time in 2016.

Transportation

New Jersey Route 56 is the main highway providing access to Deerfield Township. County Route 552 also traverses the township.

Points of interest 
 Beth Hillel Synagogue, a classical vernacular synagogue constructed in 1901 and added to the National Register of Historic Places in 1978.
 Southwind Vineyard & Winery

Notable people

People who were born in, residents of, or otherwise closely associated with Deerfield Township include:

 Joseph W. Chinnici (1919–2007), politician who served in the New Jersey General Assembly from the 1st legislative district from 1972 to 1988
 Joseph Bloomfield Leake (1828–1918), attorney and an Iowa state senator who entered the Union Army during the American Civil War
 Frank LoBiondo (born 1946), politician who served as the U.S. representative for New Jersey's 2nd congressional district from 1995 to 2019
 Al McCoy (1894–1966), boxing world middleweight champion from 1914 to 1917

References

External links

Deerfield Township website

 
1748 establishments in New Jersey
Populated places established in 1748
Township form of New Jersey government
Townships in Cumberland County, New Jersey